The triradiate pelvic girdle is a shared feature common to archosaurs. The pelvis has three prongs, with an elongate pubis and ischium. This feature first appeared in the Erythrosuchidae, large basal archosaurian predators of the early Triassic period.

References

 Benton, M. J. (2000), Vertebrate Paleontology, 2nd Ed. p. 136; (2004) 3rd edition,  Blackwell Science Ltd

Reptile anatomy